Dieye or Dièye is a surname which may refer to:

 Abdou Dieye (born 1988), French footballer
 Abdoulaye Mar Dieye, Senegalese United Nations bureaucrat
 Cheikh Bamba Dièye (born 1965), Senegalese politician
 Matar Dieye (born 1998), Senegalese footballer
 Ouleye Dieye (born 1986), Senegalese footballer
 Lingeer Ngoné Dièye, 17th century Queen and Queen Mother of Cayor and Baol

Serer surnames